Aprominta separata is a moth of the family Autostichidae. It is found on Crete.

References

Moths described in 1961
Aprominta
Moths of Europe